Buresø, is a small town in Egedal Municipality. It has a population of 468 (2022). The town is on the northern part of the island of Zealand (Sjælland), in eastern Denmark.

References  

Cities and towns in the Capital Region of Denmark
Egedal Municipality